Sefalana, is Botswana's second largest food retailer. It operates more than 1200 stores across Africa. The company's headquarters are in Gaborone, Botswana. Sefalana is a public company listed on the Botswana Stock Exchange.

History 
Sefalana was founded in 1974 as Sefalana sa Botswana.

Acquisitions 

 Delta Dairies in 2015.
 Cash ’n Carry outlet and TFS Wholesalers to enter the Lesotho market.
 Seasons Group in Australia

See also 

 Choppies
 Checkers (supermarket chain)
 Shoprite (retailer)
List of supermarket chains in Botswana

References

External links 

 

Food and drink companies of Botswana
Companies listed on the Botswana Stock Exchange
Companies of Gaborone
Botswana companies